The UCLA Bruins men's ice hockey team is a college ice hockey program that represents the University of California, Los Angeles. They are a member of the American Collegiate Hockey Association at the Division II level. The university sponsored varsity ice hockey from 1926 to 1941.

History
Before the school was even called 'UCLA', the ice hockey program was formed, joining several other local teams including USC and Occidental. The team continued for several years despite the great depression being in full force. In the late 1930s a new arena was built for the Los Angeles programs but World War II forced all of the pacific coast teams to shutter their programs in the early '40s. When teams were reconstituted afterwards, UCLA was not among the programs to resurface and the new arena, the Tropical Ice Gardens, was demolished in 1949.

UCLA eventually returned to the ice in 1961 but only as a club sport. It has continued in this capacity and currently plays against many of its former varsity opponents in the Pac-8.

Note: UCLA used the same color scheme as the University of California, Berkeley until 1949.

Season-by-season results

References

External links
Official site

UCLA Bruins
UCLA Bruins men's ice hockey
Ice hockey teams in California
1926 establishments in California
Ice hockey clubs established in 1926